Native Colours is the debut album by drummer Billy Drummond which was recorded in 1991 and released on the Dutch Criss Cross Jazz label the following year.

Reception 

In his review on Allmusic, Greg Turner stated "This is a fine debut by one of jazz's best young drummers".

Track listing 
All compositions by Renee Rosnes except where noted
 "8/4 Beat" (Bobby Hutcherson) – 5:49
 "Native Colours" – 6:11
 "San Francisco Holiday - Worry Later" (Thelonious Monk) – 6:14
 "Waltz for Sweetie" (Walter Bishop Jr.) – 10:08
 "One for Walton" – 4:54
 "Lexicon" – 6:45
 "Ruby, My Dear" (Monk) – 6:10
 "Yesterday's Gardenias" (Nelson Cogane, Sammy Mysels, Dick Robertson) – 9:57
 "Happy House" (Ornette Coleman) – 6:25

Personnel 
Billy Drummond – drums
Steve Wilson – soprano saxophone, alto saxophone
Steve Nelson – vibraphone
Renee Rosnes – piano
Ray Drummond – bass

References 

Billy Drummond albums
1992 albums
Criss Cross Jazz albums
Albums recorded at Van Gelder Studio